The small seal script, or Qin script (Qínzhuàn), is an archaic form of Chinese calligraphy. It was standardized and promulgated as a national standard by the government of Qin Shi Huang, the founder of the Chinese Qin dynasty.

Name 
Xiaozhuan, formerly romanized as Hsiao-chuan, is also known as the seal script or lesser seal script.

History 
Before the Qin conquest of the six other major warring states of Zhou China, local styles of characters had evolved independently of one another for centuries, producing what are called the "Scripts of the Six States", all of which are included under the general term "great seal script". 

However, under one unified government, the diversity was deemed undesirable as it hindered timely communication, trade, taxation, and transportation, and as independent scripts might be used to represent dissenting political ideas.

Hence, Emperor Qin Shi Huang mandated the systematic unification of weights, measures, currencies, etc., and the use of a standard writing script. Characters which were different from those found in Qin were discarded, and the Qin's small seal characters became the standard for all regions within the empire. This policy came in about 220 BC, the year after Qin's unification of the Chinese states.

Standardization 
The standardized use of small seal characters was promulgated via the Cangjiepian, a primer compiled by Qin Shi Huang's ministers. This compilation, stated to contain 3,300 characters, is no longer extant, and is known only through Chinese commentaries through the centuries. Several hundred characters from fragmented commentaries were collected during the Qing period, and recent archeological excavations in Anhui, China, have uncovered several hundred more on bamboo strips, showing the order of the characters. However, the script found is not the small seal script, as the discovery dates from Han times.

Unicode

The small seal script has been proposed for inclusion in Unicode. The 723-page proposal from 2015 lists much of the then-known examples of Qing dynasty commentary images. This topic remains under discussion by Unicode's working group as of April 2020.

See also
 Seal script
 Large seal script

References

External links 
 Topical Document List: Seal Script, Unicode
 Lookup of seal script is available through some online dictionaries. See the KU libraries guide for examples.

Qin dynasty culture
Obsolete writing systems
Chinese script style
History of the Chinese script